James City, is an unincorporated community and census-designated place in Elk County, Pennsylvania, United States. It is in the northern part of Highland Township, and its northern border is the McKean County line. As of the 2010 census the CDP population was 287.

Demographics

References

Census-designated places in Pennsylvania
Census-designated places in Elk County, Pennsylvania